Iłów  is a village in Sochaczew County, Masovian Voivodeship, in east-central Poland. It is the seat of the gmina (administrative district) called Gmina Iłów.

The village has a population of 690.

External links
 Jewish Community in Iłów on Virtual Shtetl

References

Villages in Sochaczew County